Mammoth WVH is the debut studio album by American rock band Mammoth WVH. The album was released on June 11, 2021, by EX1 Records.

Background
The album's origins can be traced back to 2013 after Wolfgang Van Halen finished the A Different Kind of Truth Tour with Van Halen and began working on his own music. The album was completed in 2018. 

For the opening track, "Mr. Ed", Wolfgang used the original Electro-Harmonix Micro-Synthesizer that his father, Eddie Van Halen, used for the 1981 Van Halen track "Sunday Afternoon in the Park".

Wolfgang used his father's original Frankenstrat guitar for the solos on "Mammoth" and "Feel". 

The album cover features a painting by American painter John Brosio of a giant crab terrorizing a parking lot. When asked about the significance of the crab, Wolfgang Van Halen responded on Twitter with a screenshot of the synonyms of the word "mammoth", further stating that "We all know it takes being a Van Halen to understand that the word mammoth means 'big.'"

Critical reception

Mammoth WVH received generally positive reviews from critics. At Metacritic, which assigns a normalized rating out of 100 to reviews from critics, the album received an average score of 79, which indicates "generally favorable reviews", based on 4 reviews.

It was elected by Loudwire as the 28th best rock/metal album of 2021. In 2021, the single "Distance" was nominated for Best Rock Song for the 64th Grammy Awards.

Track listing

Personnel
Credits for Mammoth WVH adapted from liner notes.

Mammoth WVH
 Wolfgang Van Halen – vocals, guitars, bass, drums, keyboards

Production
 Michael Baskette – production, mixing
 Brad Blackwood – mastering
 Josh Saldate – engineering
 Jef Moll – engineering, editing
 John Brosio – artwork
 Chuck Brueckmann – art direction, design
 Travis Shinn – photography

Charts

Weekly charts

Year-end charts

Singles

References

External links
 
 

2021 debut albums
Albums produced by Michael Baskette